Vicat softening temperature or Vicat hardness is the determination of the softening point for materials that have no definite melting point, such as plastics. It is taken as the temperature at which the specimen is penetrated to a depth of 1 mm by a flat-ended needle with a 1 mm2 circular or square cross-section. For the Vicat A test, a load of 10 N is used. For the Vicat B test, the load is 50 N.

Standards to determine Vicat softening point include ASTM D 1525 and ISO 306, which are largely equivalent.

The vicat softening temperature can be used to compare the heat-characteristics of different materials.

Four different methods may be used for testing.

ISO 10350 Note

ISO 10350 Vicat values are tested using the B50 method.

Similar Standards: ASTM D1525

References

Cement
Polymer chemistry